Ailen Valente (born March 26, 1996) is an Argentine female artistic gymnast, representing her nation in international competitions. She participated at the 2015 World Championships in Glasgow, and eventually qualified for 2016 Summer Olympics in Rio de Janeiro, finishing fifty-sixth in the preliminary phase of the women's artistic gymnastics with an all-around score of 50.065.

References

External links 
 
 
 
 
 
 

1996 births
Living people
Argentine female artistic gymnasts
Sportspeople from Buenos Aires
Gymnasts at the 2016 Summer Olympics
Gymnasts at the 2015 Pan American Games
Olympic gymnasts of Argentina
Pan American Games competitors for Argentina
21st-century Argentine women